Paper Tiger is a 1975 British drama-adventure film starring David Niven and the child actor Kazuhito Ando, who later portrayed Teru Tendou in Ganbaron. The film was based on a novel of the same name by Jack Davies, who also wrote the screenplay.

The title comes from a Chinese expression meaning a person who looks powerful or strong but is in fact ineffectual.

Plot summary
Walter Bradbury (David Niven) is an apparently well-educated, decorated ex-military Englishman. He informs strangers he is the son of a viscount, a Member of Parliament, and a nephew of a general, and walks with a limp and cane which he says is due to crashing in the Le Mans 24-hour race.

A Japanese ambassador to a fictional Asian country ("Kulagong") is attracted to Bradbury's claims of receiving the Military Cross (MC) twice and the Croix de Guerre once during the Second World War and hires Bradbury to tutor to his son, Koichi (played by Kazuhito Ando).

Despite Ambassador Kagoyama's growing skepticism, Bradbury becomes a trusted companion to the impressionable Koichi. Embellished stories concerning his wartime service dominate the relationship of Bradbury and Koichi, including references to multiple regiments of the British Army, not all of which are real, such as the "Brigade of Guards", the Parachute Battalion and "Parachute Commandos". Bradbury describes to Koichi how he single-handedly stormed a German position in France in 1944, how he escaped repeatedly from later German internment, and after the war used his cape to help Queen Elizabeth II cross a puddle, a corruption of the Walter Raleigh aid to Queen Elizabeth in the 16th century. The impressionable Koichi is eager to build on Bradbury's stories.

But some painful truths are revealed after Bradbury and the boy are kidnapped by political terrorists. The Ambassador is forced by the host country to deny the kidnapper's demands, which aim to exchange 65 political prisoners for the lives of Koichi and Bradbury. While imprisoned, an ailing Bradbury reveals to Koichi that his limp is due to polio rather than to wartime service, but nevertheless the two contrive an escape from their hillside prison. Despite Bradbury's frailty, bringing his military record into ever more dubious focus, the capabilities of the terrorists prove insufficient in contrast to the ingenuity of Koichi and Bradbury.

They blacken their faces (but not their clothes) and escape during the night, stealing a car which Bradbury drives recklessly down the zig zag mountain road until they crash. Still pursued by the terrorists a helicopter is sent in to rescue them.

After their escape, the film culminates with Bradbury's confession to Ambassador Kagoyama that he was a country schoolmaster during the war. Forgiven for this deception, Koichi is delighted to learn Bradbury will continue as his tutor.

Cast
 David Niven as 'Major' Walter Bradbury 
 Toshirō Mifune (voice: David de Keyser) as Ambassador Kagoyama 
 Hardy Krüger as Günther Müller 
  as Koichi Kagoyama 
 Irene Tsu as Talah 
 Ivan Desny as Foreign Minister 
 Miiko Taka as Mme. Kagoyama 
 Jeff Corey as Mr. King 
 Patricia Donahue as Mrs. King 
 Ronald Fraser as Sergeant Forster

A few Malaysian actor & actress involved 
 Salleh Ben Joned as Sokono, Kulagong police chief 
 Noor Kumalasari as Ruby, girlfriend Sargeant Forster
Mustapha Maarof as Marco, driver ambassador Kagoyama
Hussein Abu Hassan as assistant Muller

Production notes
The film was set in the fictional city of Kulagong, but was filmed mostly in Kuala Lumpur, Malaysia and the Cameron Highlands. Studio shooting took place at Twickenham Studios in London. The film's sets were designed by the art directors Tony Reading, Peter Scharff and Herbert Smith.

External links 

 
 Paper Tiger on Google Books

1975 films
British drama films
1975 drama films
Malacca
Films directed by Ken Annakin
Films about kidnapping
Films scored by Roy Budd
Films shot at Twickenham Film Studios
Films set in a fictional country
1970s English-language films
1970s British films